The Ballad of Cossack Golota is a 1937 Soviet action drama film directed by Igor Savchenko.

Plot 
The film is based on the novel R.V.S. by Arkady Gaidar. The film takes place in 1920 during the Civil War. All the men of Olkhovka village went to war. A young man Zhigan visits his grandfather and meets the son of a soldier of the Red Army - Sashko, who becomes his friend. Sashko receives information that the bandits want to kill the red commissar who must visit the village. Guys want to warn him.  The characters get mixed up with a wounded commissar and a marauding White Russian officer. They find themselves in all sorts of predicaments before the Reds arrive to save the day, and become the mascots of a troop of Bolshevik cavalry.

Starring 
 Konstantin Nassonov as Commissar
 Leonid Shekhtman as Zhigan 
 Konstantin Tyrtov as Sashko
 Nina Rusinova as Mother
 Nikolai Sokolov as Grandfather
 Viktor Seleznyov as (as Vitya Seleznyov)
 Nikolay Gorlov as Ataman Levka
 Faina Ranevskaya as priest's wife		
 Aleksandr Grechanyy as Goloven (as A. Grechanyj)
 Konstantin Starostin as Ataman Kozolup (as K. Starostin)
 Aleksandr Zhutaev as Vassili (as A. Zhutayev)
 Y. Martsinchik as Polish Officer

References

External links 

1937 films
1930s Russian-language films
Soviet black-and-white films
Soviet action drama films
1930s action drama films
1937 drama films